Shauna Robertson (born December 18, 1975) is a Canadian film producer. From 1999 to 2008, she worked frequently with Judd Apatow, and produced a number of films for Apatow Productions, including Anchorman: The Legend of Ron Burgundy (2004), The 40-Year-Old Virgin (2005), Knocked Up, Superbad (both 2007), Forgetting Sarah Marshall and Pineapple Express (both 2008).

Early life
Robertson was raised in Markham, Ontario. She says her biggest preparation for becoming a producer was having laid back parents: "It's good early training to have an incredibly irresponsible family. It forces a young person to take responsibility, to be organized. My mother called me the benevolent dictator because I liked things done in an efficient way." 

Robertson dropped out of high school at the age of 16 to move to Los Angeles, California.

Career
In Los Angeles, she became an assistant to Mike Binder, whom she had met at Camp Tamakwa in Algonquin Provincial Park, memorialized in his 1993 film Indian Summer. She went on to work for Hart Bochner, Jay Roach and Adam McKay. 

Working with McKay on Elf, she met Will Ferrell, who brought her to work on the set of Anchorman: The Legend of Ron Burgundy, where she first met director-producer Judd Apatow. With Apatow, she produced 2005's The 40-Year-Old Virgin, 2007's Knocked Up and Superbad, and 2008's Forgetting Sarah Marshall and Pineapple Express. 

While Robertson believes that her role as a female producer is to balance out the male humor in films, Apatow has called her "the rare woman who always wants to take the joke farther than any man wants to go. All nudity in my films is a result of Shauna pushing me and calling me a wimp." Actor Jonah Hill has also claimed that Robertson is "way more perverse than any of us", referring to the male writers, directors, producers and actors from Apatow's production company Apatow Productions.

Personal life
After six years of dating, Robertson became engaged to American actor Edward Norton in 2011, and they married in 2012. They have one son, Atlas, born in March 2013.

Filmography

References

External links
 

1974 births
Canadian expatriates in the United States
Place of birth missing (living people)
Film producers from Ontario
Living people
People from Markham, Ontario
Canadian women film producers